Sophie Elisabeth of Schleswig-Holstein-Sonderburg-Wiesenburg (4 May 1653 - 19 August 1684), was a German noblewoman member of the House of Oldenburg and by marriage Duchess of Saxe-Zeitz.

Born in Homburg vor der Höhe, she was the third of fifteen children born from the second marriage of Philip Louis, Duke of Schleswig-Holstein-Sonderburg-Wiesenburg with Anna Margaret of Hesse-Homburg. From her fourteen full-siblings, only seven survived to adulthood: Frederick, Charles Louis, Eleanor Margaret (by marriage Princess of Liechtenstein), William Christian, Sophie Magdalene (Abbess in Quedlinburg), Anna Fredericka Philippine (by marriage Duchess of Saxe-Zeitz-Pegau-Neustadt) and Johanna Magdalene Louise. In addition, she had two further older half-siblings from her father's first marriage with Catharina of Waldeck-Wildungen, of whom only one survived: Dorothea Elisabeth (by her two marriages Countess of Sinzendorf, Rabutin and Marchioness de Fremonville).

Life
In Wiesenburg on 14 June 1676, Sophie Elisabeth married Maurice, Duke of Saxe-Zeitz as his third wife. They had no children.

Sophie Elisabeth died in Schleusingen aged 31. She was buried in the Hallenkrypta of the Dom St.Peter und Paul, Zeitz.

References

|-

House of Oldenburg in Schleswig-Holstein
House of Wettin
1653 births
1684 deaths
Duchesses of Saxe-Zeitz